Marguerite Terdie or Terdy known as Marguerite Debreux was a French actress, lyric artist and courtesan of the XIXth.

Life 
She made her debut at the Théâtre du Châtelet in 1868.

In London she sang the repertoire of Offenbach and Hervé in 1870-1871. She was the mistress of Gabriel Hugelmann who subsidised the theatre to which she was attached. 

She was hired at the Bouffes-Parisiens in 1871 where she was to debut in Le Corsaire Noir.

In 1873, she met the  Camille Bloch, of whom she became the mistress and with whom she lived for twenty-five years from 1874 to 1899, and who, on her advice, left the theatre to devote himself to his love affairs.

Debreux is named, along with about twenty fellow artists, Alice Regnault, who sues Hugelman for slander. Méry Laurent, Gabrielle Roux, ... Despite his exoneration, this episode remains attached to his name long after the fact.

She played at the Théâtre du Palais-Royal and the Théâtre des Nouveautés in 1880.

Her furniture and objets d'art were put on sale in 1906.

Some roles 
 1868: La Poudre de Perlinpinpin, féerie by the Cogniard brothers, as Cupidon, at Théâtre du Châtelet.
 1870: Le Petit Faust, opéra bouffe, by Hervé as Méphistophélès at Lyceum Theatre, London.
 1871: La princesse de Trébizonde, by Offenbach, as Régina, revival at Bouffes-Parisiens, 15 September.
 1871: Le testament de Monsieur de Crac, operetta by Charles Lecocq, as Thibaude, at the Bouffes-Parisiens, 23 October.
 1872: Le Serpent à plumes, opéra bouffe, by Léo Delibes, revival at Bouffes-Parisiens.
 1872: La Timbale d'argent, opéra bouffe, by Léon Vasseur after a libretto by Adolphe Jaime and  Jules Noriac, as Fichtel, creation at the Bouffes-Parisiens, 9 April.
 1873: La Rosière d'ici, by Léon Roques, at the Théâtre des Bouffes-Parisiens, 27 March
 1873: La Leçon d'amour, by Livrat and Watchs.
1873: La Quenouille de Verre, by Charles Grisart, as Lucette, at the Bouffes-Parisiens, 7 November.
 1875: La Cruche cassée, by Léon Vasseur, travesti role of Louis XV, at Théâtre Taitbout.
 1876: Le Roi d'Yvetot, opéra bouffe by Léon Vasseur, at Theatre Taitbout
 1878: La Timbale d'argent, revival at Bouffes-Parisiens.
 1880: La Cantinière, operetta by Robert Planquette, as Musardin, at Théâtre des Nouveautés, 26 October.
 1882: Le Jour et la Nuit, operetta by Charles Lecocq, as Sanchette, at Tthéâtre des Nouveautés.

References

External links 

 Pictures

 Portraits de Marguerite Debreux 

19th-century French actresses
Date of birth missing
Date of death missing
Place of birth missing